Bokepyin is a town in Taninthayi Division, Myanmar.

References

External links

Populated places in Tanintharyi Region